Live Rounds in Tokyo is the first live album by Swedish metal band The Haunted, released in 2001. It was issued with their previous release The Haunted Made Me Do It. The Japanese version of the album excludes the song "Eclipse", as it was on their version of The Haunted Made Me Do It; instead right before "Hate Song" is "Blinded by Fear", which is an At the Gates cover, also making "Hate Song" the final track of that version.

Track listing

Tracks 
Track 1 from Live Rounds in Tokyo
Tracks 2, 3, 5–7, 9, 11 & 13 from The Haunted Made Me Do It  and track 17 from the reissue of that album
Tracks 4, 6, 8, 10, 12 & 14–16 from The Haunted

Personnel 
Marco Aro – vocals
Anders Björler – lead guitar
Patrik Jensen – rhythm guitar
Jonas Björler – bass
Per Möller Jensen – drums

References 

2001 live albums
Albums recorded at Akasaka Blitz
Live thrash metal albums
The Haunted (Swedish band) albums